The 2018–19 Arizona State Sun Devils men's basketball team represented Arizona State University during the 2018–19 NCAA Division I men's basketball season. The Sun Devils, led by fourth-year head coach Bobby Hurley, played their home games at Wells Fargo Arena in Tempe, Arizona as members of Pac–12 Conference. They finished the season 23–11, 12–6 in Pac-12 play to finish for second place. In the Pac-12 tournament, the Sun Devils defeated UCLA in the quarterfinals and lost to Oregon in the semifinals. They received an at-large bid to the NCAA tournament where they defeated St. John's in the First Four, and eventually lost in the First round to Buffalo.

Previous season
The Sun Devils finished the season 20–12, 8–10 in Pac-12 play to finish in a tie for eighth place. They lost in the first round of the Pac-12 tournament to Colorado. They received an at-large bid to the NCAA tournament where they lost in the First Four to Syracuse.

Off-season

Departures

2018 recruiting class

Roster

Schedule and results

|-
!colspan=12 style=| Exhibition

|-
!colspan=12 style=| Non-conference regular season

|-
!colspan=12 style=|  Pac-12 regular season

|-
!colspan=12 style=| Pac-12 tournament

|-
!colspan=12 style=| NCAA tournament

Rankings

*AP does not release post-NCAA Tournament rankings^Coaches did not release a Week 2 poll.

References

Arizona State Sun Devils men's basketball seasons
Arizona State
Arizona State Sun Devils men's basketball
Arizona State Sun Devils men's basketball
Arizona State